is a Japanese manga artist. In 1985 she participated in the publication of a dōjinshi. She remained active in that world until her debut in 1993 with the short story Fuyu ga Owarou Toshiteita (Winter Was Ending) that ran in Shogakukan's magazine, Puchi Comic.

In 2008, her gender bender psychological thriller After School Nightmare won her some of the acclaim she has back home after the Young Adult Library Services Association named it one of the best graphic novels for teenagers. The same work was also nominated for the 2007 Eisner Award for Best U.S. Edition of International Material (Japan).

Though her current drawing style is high in aesthetic value, her earlier works had less finesse. Regardless, her popularity grew largely due to her storytelling. Her works are noted for their slightly askew plots and exploration of the human psyche. Even her lighthearted Shōjo works usually have darker underlying elements. X-Day follows a group of teens whose mounting stress during senior year finals culminates in a plan to blow up their high school; the author has indicated that the series was written in response to the Columbine High School massacre. In her After School Nightmare series, she explores both sexual and gender identity issues. After was so successful in France that the French publisher released an exact replica of the key in the series as a limited edition gift. This led to a fierce online bidding war amongst Japanese fans, with the keys selling for outrageous prices.

In 2006 she released The Cornered Mouse Dreams of Cheese. Keiko Takemiya, professor of Kyoto Seika University and one of the members of the Year 24 Group, called it one of the best work published of the BL genre, despite the S&M theme. Widespread success has also followed critical acclaim with many readers rating the work five stars out of a possible 5 on Amazon.jp.

Her series  was awarded in May 2012 with the 36th Kodansha Manga Award in the category Shōjo.

Her works largely involve the individual's search for authenticity, self-knowledge and personal identity, themes that mirror her favourite author Hermann Hesse's works. Her works include shōjo, josei, and yaoi, and have been translated into many languages, including Chinese, English, French and German.

Works
  (1994)
  (1994)
  (1995)
  2 volumes (1995)
  (1996)
  4 volumes (1998)
  (1999)
  11 volumes (2001) (2010 reprint)
  (1997)
  (1998)
  (1998)
  (1999)
  2 volumes (2000)
  2 volumes (2000)
 TWINS (2000)
  3 volumes (2002)
  2 volumes (2003)
  (2004)
  (2004)
  5 volumes (2004)
  3 volumes (2004)
  (2006)
  10 volumes (2008)
  6 volumes (ongoing) (2008)
Licensed in French as Heartbroken Chocolatier by Asuka
  6 volumes (on hold) (2008)
  1 volume (2009) – sequel to Kyūso wa Chiizu no Yume wo Miru
  4 volumes (ongoing) (2011)

References

 
Living people
People from Fujisawa, Kanagawa
Women manga artists
1971 births
Manga artists from Kanagawa Prefecture
Japanese female comics artists
Female comics writers
Writers from Kanagawa Prefecture
20th-century Japanese women writers
21st-century Japanese women writers